Paul Lê Nguyễn (born 27 November 1992) is a Vietnamese swimmer. He competed in the men's 100 metre backstroke event at the 2018 FINA World Swimming Championships (25 m), in Hangzhou, China. He was born in Oklahoma, United States.

References

1992 births
Living people
Vietnamese male swimmers
Male backstroke swimmers
Sportspeople from Oklahoma
Swimmers at the 2018 Asian Games
Asian Games competitors for Vietnam
Competitors at the 2021 Southeast Asian Games
Southeast Asian Games competitors for Vietnam
20th-century Vietnamese people
21st-century Vietnamese people